The Institution Saint-Jean de Douai located in Douai (Hauts-de-France), is a private educational establishment under an association contract with the State. It welcomes 2,000 pupils from kindergarten to preparatory classes.

The Institution Saint-Jean was created in 1854 during the installation of a diocesan college in the rue Saint-Jean in Douai. The Institution's buildings were used as a military hospital by the German army from 1914 to 1918. The Institution was bombed and destroyed in 1940 and 1944. Reconstruction ended in 1958.

Preparatory classes was created in 1988 by Christophe Cadet, a former history and geography teacher at Saint-Jean. They prepare for the entrance examination for business schools (HEC, ESSEC, ESCP, EM Lyon, EDHEC, Audencia, etc.) by competing with the major Parisian high schools such as Henri-IV, Louis-le-Grand and "Ginette".

Notable teachers
 Jean-Pierre Ezin, a Beninese Emeritus Professor of mathematics at  University of Abomey-Calavi (Université d'Abomey-Calavi)

Notes

External links
 Site of Institution Saint-Jean de Douai (in French)

Saint-Jean de Douai
Douai